Deepthi Chapala also known as C.H. Deepthi is a  former badminton player.She was the bronze medalist in badminton at the 1998 Commonwealth Games in the Women's Team event.

References

External links
 

Living people
Racket sportspeople from Hyderabad, India
Sportswomen from Telangana
Indian female badminton players
Indian national badminton champions
Commonwealth Games medallists in badminton
Commonwealth Games silver medallists for India
Badminton players at the 1998 Commonwealth Games
Year of birth missing (living people)
Medallists at the 1998 Commonwealth Games